National Council of Churches in Pakistan  is the representative body of the Protestant Churches in Pakistan. It was founded as West Pakistan Christian Council in 1948 and was later renamed in 1975. The notable members of the council include the Church of Pakistan, Presbyterian Church of Pakistan, The Salvation Army and The Associated Reformed Presbyterian Church.

 
Victor Azariah is the present General Secretary of NCCP. His vision is to bring the Churches in Pakistan together through unifying actions including human development and theological advancement. NCCP is making an effort to progress on the unifying elements for Pakistani Churches and also strengthening of image of Christians in Pakistan through outward and inward communication projecting a positive and progressive image.

National Council of Churches in Pakistan - Strategic Vision 2022-2027

Preamble

Being a national body of mainstream Protestant Churches in Pakistan, the National Council of Churches in Pakistan (NCCP) resolves to work for national issues that benefit the Church as the Body of Christ through strengthening of Christian faith, denominational Churches and Church bodies. NCCP will focus on advocacy, mediation and enabling for national causes that enhance the ability of denominational Churches to address priority issues for the strengthening and empowerment of Christians in Pakistan.

Strategic Priorities

NCCP has identified two priorities that it seeks to work towards in next medium term: 2022-2027. These strategic priorities are:

- Unifying themes for Churches in Pakistan

- Image of Christians in Pakistan

Unifying themes for Churches in Pakistan

NCCP will analyse through consultative and participatory processes with the member Churches and Church Institutions, the key themes and elements that provide collaborative thinking, planning and work among the Churches and Church Institutions. Based on the consultative processes, NCCP will identify major issues that NCCP can work towards and bring about meaningful and purposive changes in.

NCCP will design interventions to bring together the existing and possible future programmes, institutions and projects within member Churches so that all efforts can be mutually aware, supportive and coordinated. This will bring about a much bigger impact than working in isolation and almost in competition with one another or at least being oblivious to each other.

Therefore, NCCP will channel its energies into analysis and development of joint platforms which will not duplicate existing work but will enhance synergies and cooperation and will ultimately serve as unifying themes for the Churches in Pakistan.

Image of Christians in Pakistan

The Pakistani Christians face dire circumstances due to their faith. Issues like prejudice, stigmatisation, marginalisation, persecution and outright threat to lives, livelihoods and assets of Christians are unfortunately commonplace in Pakistan. The main driver behind these issues is the mindset of the majority community that manifests in hatred, intolerance and aggression towards the Christians in Pakistan. This mindset emanates from the image of Pakistani Christians that the majority community believes to be true i.e., low-caste, menial and despicable. This image is shared and is matured in the minds of the majority community over generations and instigates the irrational aggression and rejection of Pakistani Christians at the hands of majority community.

NCCP will strive to change the image of Christians in Pakistan through both outward and inward communication.

NCCP will foster the collaborative positive and purposive outward communication through social and mainstream media in addition to celebrating and recognising the accomplishments of Pakistani Christians so that the majority community is reminded of and exposed to the contributions of Pakistani Christians.

NCCP will also advocate, mediate and enable for enhancement of progressive and development opportunities for Christians in Pakistan through the efforts and vocation of denominational Churches so that access to opportunities is enhanced and facilitated for the growth and development of Christians in Pakistan.

NCCP will not implement interventions but will bring together existing and possible future interventions from various Christian initiatives and Church Institutions so that a collaborative and synergistic suite of opportunities is available and actively promoted to the Pakistani Christians to facilitate them to benefit from such opportunities and strengthen not only their own lives but also contribute to the positive image of Christians in Pakistan.

Operationalising the Strategic Priorities

NCCP will continue to engage with denominational Churches as well as with global players, to work towards the main issues identified as unifying themes for Pakistani Churches and opportunities for improvement of image of Pakistani Christians.

NCCP will play the role of an advocate, a mediator and an enabler to work on the strategic priorities through collaborative planning and execution of agreed steps.

References 

Protestantism in Pakistan
1948 establishments in Pakistan